Richard Foulkes (born 1902) was an English professional footballer who played as a right half.

Career
Born in Castleford, Foulkes played for Frickley Colliery, Bradford City and Bournemouth.

For Bradford City he made 35 appearances in the Football League; he also made 3 appearances in the FA Cup.

Sources

References

1902 births
Year of death missing
English footballers
Frickley Athletic F.C. players
Bradford City A.F.C. players
AFC Bournemouth players
English Football League players
Association football wing halves